Nikolay Aleksandrovich Kuznetsov (born 20 July 1973) is a retired Russian professional track bicycle racer. He won a silver medal at the 1996 Summer Olympics. His sister is tennis player Svetlana Kuznetsova.

Palmares 

1996
 , Olympic Games - Team Pursuit

References

External links 
 cyclingwebsite profile
 sport-reference profile

1973 births
Living people
Russian male cyclists
Russian track cyclists
Olympic cyclists of the Unified Team
Olympic cyclists of Russia
Cyclists at the 1992 Summer Olympics
Cyclists at the 1996 Summer Olympics
Olympic silver medalists for Russia
Olympic medalists in cycling
Place of birth missing (living people)
Medalists at the 1996 Summer Olympics